The Invader is a 1935 British comedy film directed by Adrian Brunel and starring Buster Keaton, Lupita Tovar and Lyn Harding. The film follows the same plot as its remake Pest from the West (1939), with a millionaire setting out to win a local girl in Mexico.

The film was produced as a quota quickie at Isleworth Studios by British & Continental as part of a contract to supply films for MGM to meet its annual quota set by the British government. The film is also known under the alternative title An Old Spanish Custom,

Cast
 Buster Keaton as Leander Proudfoot 
 Lupita Tovar as Lupita Melez 
 Lyn Harding as Gonzalo Gonzalez 
 Esme Percy as Jose 
 Andreas Malandrinos as Carlos the barman 
 Clifford Heatherley as Cheeseman 
 Hilda Moreno as Carmita 
 Webster Booth as Cantina Singer

References

External links

 The Invader at the International Buster Keaton Society

1935 films
Films directed by Adrian Brunel
British black-and-white films
Films shot at Isleworth Studios
1935 comedy films
British comedy films
Films set in Mexico
Films produced by Sam Spiegel
1930s English-language films
1930s British films
English-language comedy films